Neopolyptychus prionites is a moth of the family Sphingidae. It is known from lowland forests and heavy woodland from Guinea to the Congo and western Uganda.

References

Neopolyptychus
Moths described in 1916
Insects of West Africa
Insects of Uganda
Insects of Angola
Insects of the Central African Republic
Insects of Chad
Insects of the Republic of the Congo
Insects of Equatorial Guinea
Moths of Africa